Jalal Talabani (1933 – 3 October 2017) was an Iraqi Kurdish politician who served as the sixth president of Iraq from 2006 to 2014, as well as the  president of the Governing Council of Iraq. He was the first non-Arab president of Iraq. He is known as Mam Jalal (uncle Jalal in Kurdish) amongst the Kurds.

Talabani was the founder and secretary-general of one of the main Kurdish political parties, the Patriotic Union of Kurdistan (PUK). He was a prominent member of the Interim Iraq Governing Council, which was established following the overthrow of Saddam Hussein in the 2003 invasion of Iraq. Talabani was an advocate for Kurdish rights and democracy in Iraq for more than 50 years.

Early life and education
Talabani was born in Kelkan village into the Koysinjaq branch of the Talabani family. The Talabani lineage has produced many leading social figures including the poet Riza Talabani, his grandfather, Abd al-Karim Qasim prime minister (1958–1963) and former National Democratic Party's member Hasan Talabani and Mukarram Talabani, a prominent member of the Communist party.

Talabani received his elementary and intermediate school education in Koya (Koysanjak) and his high school education in Erbil and Kirkuk. When he was in his teens, Talabani's peers began referring to him as "Mam" Jalal, as 'mam' meaning "paternal uncle" in Kurdish, and the Kurds have called him by this affectionate name ever since. In 1953, he began to study law at the Baghdad University. He had to flee into exile in Syria in 1956, in order to prevent an arrest for being involved In activities of the Kurdish Students Union. Residing in Damascus, he was involved in the establishment the Kurdistan Democratic Party of Syria (KDPS) . He later returned to Iraq and gained a degree in 1959.

Career

Rights for Kurds
After completing his studies at the Baghdad University, he entered the Iraqi Army, where he served shortly as a tank unit commander. In the early 1960, he was made the head of the Polit bureau of the Kurdistan Democratic Party (KDP).  When in September 1961, the Kurdish uprising for the rights of the Kurds in northern Iraq was declared against the Baghdad government of Abd al-Karim Qasim, Talabani took charge of the Kirkuk and Silemani battlefronts and organized and led separatist movements in Mawat, Rezan and the Qaradagh regions.

In March 1962, he led a coordinated offensive that brought about the liberation of the district of Sharbazher from Iraqi government forces. When not engaged in fighting in the early and mid-1960s, Talabani undertook numerous diplomatic missions, representing the Kurdish leadership at meetings in Europe and the Middle East. In 1964, he and the Barzani family had a dispute over the direction of the KDP and Talabani left Iraq and settled in Iran.  In Iran he purchased weapons without the knowledge  of the Barzanis, following which he was expelled from the KDP in summer 1964.

After the March 1970 agreement between the Iraqi government and the Kurdish rebels, Talabani returned to Iraqi Kurdistan, and rejoined the KDP, even though he wouldn't hold an office at the time. The Kurdish separatist movement collapsed in March 1975, after Iran ended their support in exchange for a border agreement with Iraq. This agreement was the 1975 Algiers Agreement, where Iraq gave up claims to the Shatt al-Arab (Arvand Rūd) waterway and Khuzestan, which later became the basis for the Iran–Iraq War. Believing it was time to give a new direction to the Kurdish separatists and to the Kurdish society, Talabani, with a group of Kurdish intellectuals and activists, founded the Kurdish Patriotic Union of Kurdistan (Yekiaiti Nishtimani Kurdistan).

In 1976, he began organizing an armed campaign for Kurdish independence inside Iraqi Kurdistan. From 1977 onwards, he established the PUK base within Iranian Kurdistan in Nawkhan and another one in Iraqi Kurdistan in Qandil. During the 1980s, Talabani sided with Iran and led a Kurdish struggle from bases inside Iraq until the crackdown against Kurdish separatists from 1987 to 1988. Following the invasion of Kuwait by Iraq in August 1990, he travelled to the United States, in order to offer his services and troops to the United States and raise support for the PUK. But his attempts did not bear the success he expected at the time.

In 1991, he helped inspire a renewed effort for Kurdish independence. He negotiated a ceasefire with the Iraqi Ba'athist government that saved the lives of many Kurds and worked closely with the United States, United Kingdom, France and other countries to set up the safe haven in Iraqi Kurdistan. In 1992 the Kurdistan Regional Government was founded. He was also supportive of peace negotiations between the Kurdistan Workers' Party and Turkey,  and was also present as Abdullah Öcalan announced the ceasefire of the PKK on the 17 March and prolonged it indefinitely on the 16 April 1993.

Talabani pursued a negotiated settlement to the Iraqi Kurdish Civil War, as well as the larger issue of Kurdish rights in the current regional context. He worked closely with other Kurdish politicians as well as the rest of the Iraqi opposition factions. In close coordination with Masoud Barzani, Talabani and the Kurds played a key role as a partner of the U.S. led Coalition in the invasion of Iraq.

Talabani was a member of the Iraqi Governing Council which negotiated the Transitional Administrative Law (TAL), Iraq's interim constitution. The TAL governed all politics in Iraq and the process of writing and adopting the final constitution.

Presidency

Talabani was elected President of Iraq on April 6, 2005, by the Iraqi National Assembly and sworn into office the following day.

On 22 April 2006, Talabani began his second term as President of Iraq, becoming the first President elected under the country's new constitution. His office was part of the Presidency Council of Iraq. Nawshirwan Mustafa was Talabani's deputy until Mustafa resigned in 2006 and formed an opposition party called Gorran.

He supported Barzani's extended presidency of the Kurdistan Region post-2013.

Health and death
On 18 December 2012, Talabani suffered a stroke and was in intensive care in Baghdad, where his condition eventually stabilized after reports that he was in a coma. A statement on the President's official website said that he was being treated for blocked arteries. On 20 December, Talabani's condition had improved enough to allow travel to Germany for treatment. The head of Talabani's medical team in Iraq has been Governor Najmiddin Karim. On 19 July 2014, Jalal Talabani returned to Iraq after more than 18 months of medical treatment. Due to his absence from politics, as a result of his illness, the PUK became consumed by a succession crisis.

Jalal Talabani died on 3 October 2017, at the age of 83, in Berlin, Germany, of a cerebral hemorrhage as complications of the stroke he suffered in 2012.  He died a few days after the referendum about the independence of Iraqi Kurdistan was approved by the voters. Masoud Barzani, President of Kurdistan Regional Government and for years his Kurdish rival, announced seven days of mourning in Iraqi Kurdistan in memory of Talabani. Iraqi Prime Minister Haider al-Abadi also announced three days of mourning in the country. His state funeral was held on 6 October 2017. Millions turned out across the cities and memorials were held across the globe.

Personal life
Talabani was married to Hero Ibrahim Ahmed, daughter of Ibrahim Ahmed. They are the parents of two sons, Bafel and Qubad. Qubad is the deputy Prime Minister of the Kurdistan Regional Government in Erbil since 2014. His nephew is Lahur Talabany.

References

External links

 S. R. Valentine, Peshmerga: Those who face death, its history, development and fight against ISIS, Kindle Direct Publishing, 2018, Peshmerga 'Those Who Face Death': The Kurdish Army: its history, development and the fight against ISIS
 Kurdistan Regional Government 
 

|-

|-

1933 births
2017 deaths
Government of Iraq
Members of the Council of Representatives of Iraq
Patriotic Union of Kurdistan politicians
People of the 1991 uprisings in Iraq
Presidents of Iraq
Presidents of Kurdistan Region
Iraqi dissidents
Kurdish politicians
Exiled politicians
Prime Ministers of Iraq